The 2021 NCAA Division III women's basketball tournament was to have been the tournament hosted by the NCAA to determine the national champion of Division III women's collegiate basketball in the United States for the 2020–21 NCAA Division III women's basketball season. However, the tournament was cancelled due to the COVID-19 pandemic.

The championship rounds were scheduled to be hosted by Roanoke College at the Cregger Center in Salem, Virginia.

Of schools and conferences that played, the Hope Flying Dutch were named mythical national champions through the D3sports.com polls.

See also
 2021 NCAA Division I women's basketball tournament
 2021 NCAA Division II women's basketball tournament
 2021 NAIA women's basketball tournament
 2021 NCAA Division III men's basketball tournament

References

 
NCAA Division III women's basketball tournament
2021 in sports in Virginia
NCAA Division III women's basketball tournament